John Vanhara (born 12 May 1972 in Brno) is an American-Czech businessman, writer and blogger. He was born in Czechoslovakia as "Jan Vaňhara", but in 2002 he moved to the United States, where he studied a business administration at the California Coast University. His business activities started in Las Vegas, Nevada, where he founded several companies included EastBiz.com, IncParadise, etc.

In 2007 he founded the transport company Shipito, which was sold to Tritium Partners in 2015.

References

Sources
Article contains translated text from John Vanhara on the Czech Wikipedia retrieved on 20 November 2018.

External links
 Personal blog about entrepreneurship
 Facebook
 Twitter

Businesspeople from Brno
21st-century American businesspeople
California Coast University alumni
1972 births
Living people
Czech emigrants to the United States